Stephen Milling is a Danish operatic bass who has had an active international career since the mid-1990s. Although his repertoire encompasses a wide range, he is particularly known for his portrayals in the operas of Richard Wagner.

Career
Born 1965 in Copenhagen, Milling studied voice at the Royal Danish Academy of Music and has been a member of the Royal Danish Opera since 1994. In the 1999-2000 season, Milling made his La Scala debut as Rocco in Beethoven's Fidelio under conductor Riccardo Muti. Soon after, he made his American debut with the Seattle Opera, singing Fasolt in Das Rheingold and Hunding in Die Walküre in Wagner's Der Ring des Nibelungen. He returned to Seattle as Gurnemanz in Parsifal for which he won the Opera's Artist of the Year award in 2003, and in 2010, he sang King Marke in Tristan und Isolde, also with Seattle Opera. He has sung the role of Sparafucile in Rigoletto at the Metropolitan Opera in New York, King Marke at the Lyric Opera of Chicago, Sarastro in The Magic Flute at the Royal Opera, London, Gurnemanz and King Marke at the Vienna State Opera, and Rocco at the Liceu.

In the 2009-2010 season he sang King Philip in Don Carlos at the Vienna State Opera, Fafner in Siegfried and Narbal in Les Troyens at the Palau de les Arts Reina Sofía in Valencia with Valery Gergiev, Hermann Landgraf in Tannhäuser and Sarastro in The Magic Flute at the Copenhagen Opera House, Gurnemanz in Parsifal at the Staatsoper Stuttgart, and the Verdi Requiem with Mariss Jansons and the Berlin Philharmonic in Berlin and Salzburg.

Recordings
Milling has recorded Narbal in Les Troyens with Colin Davis and sung the same role with the Chicago Symphony under Zubin Mehta. This recording won a Grammy Award in 2002 for Best Opera Recording.

Personal life
Milling grew up in the village of Annisse by the lake Arresø in Denmark. Milling is married and has three sons. He has taken his family to Seattle for rehearsals, starting when his youngest was only 13 days old.

References

Seattle Opera blog

Living people
Danish opera singers
Operatic basses
People from Copenhagen
Royal Danish Academy of Music alumni
Year of birth missing (living people)